Stuart Milligan is an American actor based primarily in the United Kingdom, best known for his recurring role (1998–2010) as Adam Klaus in Jonathan Creek.

Career
Milligan has been seen extensively on British television. An early role was Max Sampson in the ATV soap Crossroads. He played a US Navy Drill Instructor in the 1982 black comedy Whoops Apocalypse (London Weekend Television for ITV), then garnered further TV appearances in Chalk and Secret Army. He had a brief scene in the 1985 motion picture Santa Claus: The Movie, in which he can be seen seated next to the chairman in the court room at the trial of the character BZ. In 1986 he played "Hanks" who leads the ill-fated salvage team that picks up Ellen Ripley in Aliens. In 2006, he guest-starred on the Doctor Who audio drama The Reaping, while in 2007 he starred in an episode of Lewis. Milligan appeared in an episode of Midsomer Murders, entitled "Country Matters".

Milligan has done voice-over work in such video games as Desperados: Wanted Dead or Alive, Rocky Legends, Farscape: The Game and more recently, Pac-Man World 3. He portrayed Mr. Green in the CD-i editions of the boardgame Cluedo (1994–95; later remade into a CD-Rom game in 1997) in addition to providing voices for the English dub of Robin Hood no Daibōken.

In 1988, Milligan played the title role in the BBC Radio 4 docudrama Superman On Trial, written and directed by Dirk Maggs. A full series followed in 1990, and a second series in 1993. He later went on to play The Riddler in the BBC Radio 1 audio dramatisation of Batman: Knightfall. He also played Judge Cord Elam in Oklahoma!.

Milligan appeared in the West End musical Jersey Boys (as of December 2011) and was a member of the original London cast of 2008.

In 2009 he played Colonel Stark in the Doctor Who animation Dreamland. He played General Randy Badger in Episode 3 ("The General") of the BBC Scotland comedy Gary: Tank Commander, which aired on BBC 2 Scotland on Saturday, 5 December 2009. He played U.S. President Richard Nixon in the Doctor Who episodes "The Impossible Astronaut" and "Day of the Moon" as well as for a special prequel released online.

In 2009, he was involved in a Korean cartoon series called Rocket Boy and Toro where he played a character called Vector. In 2014, he played the role of CIA analyst Arthur O'Neill in The Assets.

He played an unnamed US president in Wonder Woman 1984 (2020).

Filmography

Film

Television

Video games

References

Living people
American emigrants to the United Kingdom
American male film actors
American male television actors
American male musical theatre actors
American male voice actors
20th-century American male actors
21st-century American male actors
Year of birth missing (living people)
Place of birth missing (living people)